Mucho Gusto (foaled  April 26, 2016) is an American Thoroughbred racehorse who won the 2020 Pegasus World Cup.

Racing Career
Mucho Gusto's first race was on September 20, 2018 at Los Alamitos Race Course where he came in first. His next race was the Grade 3 Bob Hope Stakes, on November 17, 2018, where he also came in first. He finished his 2018 season with a second place finish at the Grade 1 Los Alamitos Futurity.

Mucho Gusto began his 2019 season on February 2 with a win in the Grade 3 Robert B. Lewis Stakes. On May 18, he picked up a win at the Grade 3 Lazaro Barrera Memorial Stakes. He then picked up another win the month after by winning the Affirmed Stakes. On July 20, he finished second in the Grade 1 Haskell Invitational, and on August 24, he finished third in the Grade 1 Travers Stakes. His final race of the season was a fourth place finish in the September 29 Oklahoma Derby.

He began his 2020 season with the biggest win of his career by winning his first Grade 1 race, the Pegasus World Cup. His next start was the $20 million Saudi Cup, where he finished third. He didn't record any workouts until October at Los Alamitos Race Course where he ran a leisurely 3 furlongs.

In the 2020 World's Best Racehorse Rankings, Mucho Gusto was rated on 118, making him the equal 80th best racehorse in the world.

Pedigree

References

2016 racehorse births
Racehorses bred in Kentucky
Racehorses trained in the United States
Thoroughbred family A29